Chavagnes-en-Paillers is a commune of the Vendée department in the Pays de la Loire region in western France.

Chavagnes en Paillers is known as one of the two villes saintes (holy towns) of the Vendée. (The other is Saint-Laurent-sur-Sèvre). It is home to the mother-houses of two religious congregations: the Sons of Mary Immaculate and the Ursulines of Jesus, both founded by the Roman Catholic priest Louis-Marie Baudouin in about 1802 in the wake of the French Revolution (1789) and the War in the Vendée (mainly 1793-1796).

Still present also in Chavagnes is the seminary Baudouin founded for the training of boys and men destined for the priesthood. It was the first junior seminary to be approved in France after the Revolution. It now continues as Chavagnes International College, an international Catholic boarding school for boys, teaching through the medium of English.

The word Chavagnes is thought to come from the dog Latin cabanas, meaning cabins. The inhabitants are known as Chavagnais.

Statistics
Altitude: 36 m (mini) – 92 m (maxi)
Area of the 'commune' of Chavagnes: 40,57 km²
Population: 2 963 hab (in 1999)
Population density: 73 inhabitants per square kilometre

See also
Communes of the Vendée department

References

External links

Official site
Website of Chavagnes International College
The Annual 100km race in Chavagnes-en-Paillers

Communes of Vendée